Midlands Rugby Football Club is a New Zealand amateur rugby team that plays in the Go Bus Southland Wide Premier Division. The team was recently promoted to the top grade. The team has included Stags star Scott Cowan and former Highlander Matt Saunders.
Midlands Rugby Football club won the Ack Soper Shield in 2019.

References
Southland Rugby Clubs Page
https://web.archive.org/web/20090214005442/http://rugbysouthland.co.nz/index.php?pageLoad=28&par=7

New Zealand rugby union teams
Sport in Southland, New Zealand